Admiral Sir Day Hort Bosanquet,  (22 March 1843 – 28 June 1923) was a British politician and senior officer in the Royal Navy. He served as the Governor of South Australia from 18 February 1909 until 22 March 1914.

Naval career
Born in Alnwick in Northumberland, Bosanquet joined the Royal Navy in 1857. He was present at the taking of Canton.

He was appointed Commander-in-Chief, East Indies Station in 1899, and served as such until June 1902, when he returned home, and was promoted to vice-admiral on 1 July 1902. Two years later he was appointed Commander-in-Chief, North America and West Indies Station in 1904 and Commander-in-Chief, Portsmouth in 1907. He retired from this post and the Royal Navy on 23 March 1908.

In retirement Bosanquet became Governor of South Australia.

Personal life
He was a major landholder around Llanwarne, Herefordshire in England, living at Brom-y-clos. Bosanquet's daughter Beatrice Mary (b. 1881, d. 1 Sept, 1957) married Vice-Admiral Sir Raymond Fitzmaurice in 1919. Bosanquet died at Newbury, Berkshire on 28 June 1923.

Honours

See also
County of Bosanquet

References

|-

|-

|-

Governors of South Australia
1843 births
1923 deaths
Knights Grand Cross of the Order of St Michael and St George
Knights Grand Cross of the Royal Victorian Order
Knights Commander of the Order of the Bath
Commanders Grand Cross of the Order of the Sword
Royal Navy admirals
Royal Navy personnel of the Boxer Rebellion
British emigrants to Australia